Philodromus vulgaris is a species of spider, commonly called the longlegged crab spider, in the genus Philodromus found in the USA and Canada.

References

vulgaris
Spiders of North America
Spiders described in 1847